Heitmeyer is a German surname. Notable people with the surname include:

Constance Heitmeyer, American electrical engineer
Jayne Heitmeyer (born 1960), Canadian actress
Wilhelm Heitmeyer (born 1945), German academic

German-language surnames